Anja Al-Erhayem (born 1971 in Denmark) is a Danish filmmaker born to an Iraqi father and Danish mother.

Before the US-led invasion of Iraq, in 2002, Anja travelled to Iraq with her father to make a film about his family. The film titled Back to Baghdad, showed unique footage of everyday life in Iraq under Saddam Hussein. The film itself has won a number of international prizes. After the war started, Anja went back to make a follow-up to her first film.

Filmography
 Back to Baghdad (2003)
 Wide Angle - A Woman Among Warlords (2007)

References

External links

Official Facebook

Living people
Iraqi women film directors
1974 births
Danish people of Iraqi descent
Danish women film directors
Iraqi film directors